Koszewski (feminine Koszewska) is a Polish surname. Notable persons with this name include:

 Andrzej Koszewski (1922–2015), Polish composer
 Dietmar Koszewski (born 1967), German hurdler
 Irvin Koszewski (1924–2009), American bodybuilder
Waldemar Koszewski (born 1959), Polish physician, neurosurgeon and neurotraumatologist, academic teacher and lecturer

Polish-language surnames